The 2022 ADAC Formula 4 Championship was the eighth and final season of ADAC Formula 4, an open-wheel motor racing series. It was a multi-event motor racing championship that featured drivers competing in 1.4 litre Tatuus-Abarth single seat race cars that conformed to the technical regulations for the championship.

Teams and drivers

Race calendar and results 
The provisional calendar was released on 7 November 2021. The opening two rounds supported the 2022 24H GT Series and the next three raced alongside the 2022 ADAC GT Masters. The finale was a part of ADAC Racing Weekend event.

Championship standings 
Points were awarded to the top 10 classified finishers (excluding guest drivers) in each race. No points were awarded for pole position or fastest lap. The final classifications for the individual championships were obtained by summing up the scores on the 16 best results obtained during the races held.

Drivers' Championship

Rookies' Championship

Teams' Cup 
Only two best team's drivers in each race were eligible to score points. The other drivers were omitted during rewarding the points.

Notes

References

External links 

 

ADAC Formula 4 seasons
ADAC
ADAC Formula
ADAC Formula 4 Championship